Elizabeth Mary Tasker is an Australian fire ecologist. She obtained a PhD in Science at the University of Sydney in 2002. She is a researcher at the NSW Office of Environment and Heritage, and previously worked for the University of Wollongong and for The Australian Museum carrying out biological surveys in Melanesia. Her main area of expertise is the effects of fire and fire management on native animals and plants. She was a Vice-President, and subsequently (to 2015) Director, of the Ecological Society of Australia, the largest professional association of scientists in Australia, and a published wildlife photographer.

Selected publications

References

External links 
 

Australian zoologists
Australian women scientists
Living people
Year of birth missing (living people)